Villnöß (Ladin: Funès) is a comune (municipality) in South Tyrol in northern Italy, located about  northeast of the city of Bolzano.

Geography

The municipality of Villnöß contains the frazioni (subdivisions, mainly villages and hamlets) Koll (Colle), St. Jakob (San Giacomo), St. Magdalena (Santa Maddalena), St. Peter (San Pietro), St. Valentin (San Valentino) and Teis (Tiso).

Villnöß borders the following municipalities: Brixen, Klausen, Lajen, Urtijëi, San Martin de Tor, Santa Cristina Gherdëina and Feldthurns.

History

Coat-of-arms
The emblem represents three piles of argent on azure, the three peaks symbolize the Odle Group in the head to the Valley of Funes. The emblem was adopted in 1967.

Society

Linguistic distribution
According to the 2011 census, 97.69% of the population speak German, 1.99% Italian and 0.32% Ladin as first language.

Demographic evolution

References

External links
 Homepage of the municipality

Municipalities of South Tyrol